The Central Museum is a museum in Southend-on-Sea, Essex, England. The museum houses collections of local and natural history and contains a planetarium constructed by astronomer Harry Ford in 1984.

The museum was opened in April 1981 in a Grade II listed building that was previously Southend's first free public library. The library service had moved to a new purpose built site on Victoria Avenue, which opened on 20 March 1974.

The building
The Museum was originally built in 1905 as a free library, with £8,000 of funding from Andrew Carnegie. The architect was Henry Thomas Hare. The building was listed in 1974.

The collections
The Museum features a collection of original Ekco radios, manufactured by E.K. Cole & Co. Ltd. (or 'Ekco') formerly based in Southend. In the 1930s, this company was one of Britain's largest radio manufacturers.

The displays also include local and natural history and archaeology.

In September 2018 the museum opened a major exhibition of finds recovered from the wreck of the London, a 17th Century Cromwellian era warship that exploded and sank in the Thames Estuary in 1665. The exhibition ran till July 2019.

In May 2019 a new gallery opened to display the archaeological finds from the Royal Saxon tomb in Prittlewell, an Anglo-Saxon burial mound in the suburb of Prittlewell that was discovered in 2003 as a result of a road-widening scheme. The excavations unearthed a number of Anglo-Saxon artefacts that suggested a high-status burial; carbon dating has revealed that the burial probably dates from about 580 AD, and may have been the tomb of Sæxa, brother of Sæberht, King of Essex.

From October 2021 the museum plans to host a new exhibition titled Wunderkammer: Southend's Cabinet of Curiosity.

Additional photographs

References

External links

Southend Central Museum website

Museums in Essex
Buildings and structures in Southend-on-Sea
Former library buildings in England
Museums established in 1981
Planetaria in the United Kingdom
Natural history museums in England
Local museums in Essex
1981 establishments in England
Buildings by Henry Hare
Grade II listed buildings in Essex